Cesar Chelor (born in Wrentham, Massachusetts) was an African-American woodworker, toolmaker, plane-maker and was enslaved by the colonial entrepreneur and the earliest  documented American plane maker Francis Nicholson (1683-1753). Chelor is the earliest documented African-American plane maker in North America.

Background 
Chelor's exact birthdate is unknown, however, he is thought to have been born in 1720. He was owned by Nicholson as early as 1736. In 1741, Chelor was admitted as a member to the Congregational Church in Wrentham Center, when he was supposedly 21. Chelor would become a freeman when Nicholson died in 1753. Along with freedom, Nicholson willed Chelor a workshop, 10 acres of land, tools and materials to continue on independently. Chelor was married to Juda Russell in 1758, with whom he had shared eight children. In 1784, Chelor died without a will with an estate inventory valued at 77 pounds 2 shillings.

Notes & references

Notes

References 

1720 births
1784 deaths
People from Wrentham, Massachusetts
American freedmen
18th-century American slaves